The Ukrainians are a British band, which plays traditional Ukrainian music, heavily influenced by western post-punk.

Career
The Ukrainians were formed in 1990 by Wedding Present guitarist Peter Solowka, with singer/violinist Len Liggins and mandolin player Roman Remeynes, after all three had played on the Wedding Present's Ukrainian John Peel Sessions recordings (Ukrayinski Vystupy v Johna Peela, released 1989).  Following the success of that release, the trio began composing and recording in Ukrainian as a separate band.

In 1991, their first EP, Oi Divchino, was awarded Single of the Week by British music weekly, NME.   Notably, the video for this release was filmed in pre-revolution Kyiv making them the first western band to produce a video entirely in Eastern Europe.

In the same year, Solowka left the Wedding Present, later claiming that he had been kicked out, the success of the Ukrainian project making him the scapegoat for the band's lack of mainstream success.

Since 1991, the band have released five studio albums as well as various live albums and EPs, all without chart success in the UK. They continue to tour regularly, especially in Poland and England.  They celebrated 20 years of the band in 2011 with a tour of British Ukrainian clubs.

Band members
Besides Solowka, Liggins and Remeynes, band members have included:
Dave Lee - drums
Woody - drums, percussion
Chris Harrop - bass guitar
Paul 'Dino' Briggs - bass guitar
Allan Martin - bass guitar
Alan Dawson- Bass guitar
James Howe - bass guitar
Stepan "Ludwig" Pasicznyk - accordion, backing vocals, guitar
Steve Tymruk - accordion, melodion, backing vocals
Paul Weatherhead - electric mandolin, sopilka, theremin
Michael L.B. West - mandolin, guitar, piano, trumpet, duda, oud, 'cello, euphonium

The current line-up comprises Liggins, Solowka, Tymruk, Wood, Weatherhead and Howe.

Discography 

Albums and EPs and singles include:

 Oi Divchino (1991)
 The Ukrainians (1991)
 Pisni iz The Smiths (EP) (1992) (four songs originally by The Smiths translated into Ukrainian, also included as bonus tracks on reissues of Vorony).
 Vorony (1993)
 Live in Germany (1993)
 Kultura (1994)
 Radioactivity (Single) (1996), a cover of the Kraftwerk song, in order to raise money for the Children of Chernobyl charity and to mark the 10th anniversary of the Chernobyl nuclear disaster.
 Drink to my Horse! The Ukrainians Live (2001)
 Anarchy In The UK (EP) (2002) (three songs originally by the Sex Pistols translated into Ukrainian).
 Respublika (2002)
 Istoriya: The Best of the Ukrainians (2004)
 Live in Czeremcha (2008)
 Diaspora (2009)
 20 Years (Best of) (2011)
  A History of Rock Music in Ukrainian (2015)
Summer in Lviv (2018)

References

External links
 The Ukrainians official site
 The Ukrainians at Discogs

English folk musical groups
English rock music groups
Musical groups established in 1991
Ukrainian rock music groups
Ukrainian-language singers
1991 establishments in England